Eileen Maud Blair (née O'Shaughnessy, 25 September 1905 – 29 March 1945) was the first wife of George Orwell (Eric Arthur Blair). During World War II, she worked for the Censorship Department of the Ministry of Information in London and the Ministry of Food.

She was born in South Shields in the northeast of England. Her mother was Marie O'Shaughnessy and her father was Lawrence O'Shaughnessy, a customs collector. She died at the age of 39 during an operation.

Education and early life

O'Shaughnessy attended Sunderland Church High School. In the autumn of 1924, she entered St Hugh's College, Oxford, where she studied English. In 1927, she received a higher second-class degree. By choice there followed a succession of jobs 'of no special consequence and with no connection from one to the next', which she held briefly, and which began with work as an assistant mistress at Silchester House, a girls' boarding school in Taplow in the Thames valley, and included being a secretary; a reader for the elderly Dame Elizabeth Cadbury; and the proprietor of an office in Victoria Street, London, for typing and secretarial work. When she closed it down she took up freelance journalism, selling an occasional feature piece to the Evening News. She also helped her brother, Laurence, a thoracic surgeon by typing, proofreading and editing his scientific papers and books.

In the autumn of 1934, Eileen enrolled at University College, London for a two-year graduate course in educational psychology, leading to a Master of Arts qualification. Eileen was particularly interested in testing intelligence in children "and quite early decided upon that as the subject for the thesis she would be writing". Elizaveta Fen (pen name of Lydia Jackson Jiburtovich), a fellow student who became one of O'Shaughnessy's closest friends, met her then for the first time: "She was twenty-eight years old and looked several years younger. She was tall and slender, her shoulders rather broad and high. She had blue eyes and dark brown, naturally wavy hair. George once said that she had 'a cat's face' – and one could see that this was true in a most attractive sense..."

She was very close to her elder brother Laurence O'Shaughnessy, a thoracic surgeon, but even so, in a letter she described her brother as "one of nature's Fascists".

Marriage

Eileen met Eric Blair in the spring of 1935. At the time Blair was living at 77 Parliament Hill in Hampstead, occupying a spare room in the first floor flat of Rosalind Henschel Obermeyer, a niece of the conductor and composer Sir George Henschel and a friend of Mabel Fierz.

Rosalind Obermeyer was taking an advanced course in psychology at University College London; one evening she invited some of her friends and acquaintances to a party. One "was an attractive young woman whom Rosalind did not know especially well, although they often sat next to each other at lectures: her name was Eileen O'Shaughnessy." Elizaveta Fen recalled Orwell in her memoirs, Orwell and his friend and mentor Richard Rees, "draped" at the fireplace, looking, she thought, "moth-eaten and prematurely aged."

Eric Blair married Eileen O'Shaughnessy the next year, on 9 June 1936, at St Mary's Church, Wallington, Hertfordshire (as Eric Arthur Blair and Eileen Maud O'Shaughnessy; at this time he was known as Orwell only in his writing, his friends knew him as Eric or Blair; and he "never quite got around to changing it").  Blair, though a non-practising member of the Church of England, "was sufficiently a traditionalist to wish to be married in it." They tried to have children, but Eileen did not become pregnant and they learnt later that Orwell was sterile, as he told Rayner Heppenstall, as Eileen confided in Elizaveta Fen.

Eileen joined her husband in Spain during the Spanish Civil War. Eileen volunteered for a post in the office of John McNair, the leader of the Independent Labour Party who coordinated the arrival of British volunteers, and with the help of Georges Kopp paid visits to her husband, bringing him English tea, chocolate, and cigars. She had a relationship with Kopp at this time (Eileen and Orwell had a "somewhat open marriage"). By June 1937, the political situation had deteriorated and Orwell and Eileen were under threat and had to lie low, although they broke cover to try to help Kopp. After getting their passports in order, they escaped from Spain by train, diverting to Banyuls-sur-Mer for a short stay before returning to England.  

At the start of World War II, Eileen began working in the Censorship Department of the Ministry of Information in London, staying during the week with her family in Greenwich. Her brother, Laurence, was killed by a bomb during the evacuation from Dunkirk, after which, according to Elizaveta Fen, "her grip on life, which had never been very firm, loosened considerably."

In spring 1942, she changed jobs to work at the Ministry of Food. In June 1944 she and Eric adopted a three-week-old boy they named Richard Horatio. In one of her last letters to Blair, Eileen wrote of arrangements for renting and decorating Barnhill, Jura, the house where Orwell would write most of Nineteen Eighty Four – but she died before she ever saw Barnhill.

Death
Eileen's brother, Laurence O'Shaughnessy, had married Gwen Hunton; Gwen had a property called "Greystone" near Carlton, County Durham, that had been left empty on the death of her maiden aunt. The Blairs stayed there on many occasions during 1944 and 1945. Gwen evacuated her children to the location when the "flying-bomb" raids began, and Richard went there when the Blairs had been bombed out of their flat in Maida Vale in June 1944.

In early 1945, Eileen was in very poor health and went to stay there. Joyce Pritchard, the O'Shaughnessy's nanny, said that Eileen had visited Greystone frequently between July 1944 and March 1945.

Eileen died on 29 March 1945 in Newcastle upon Tyne under anaesthetic. She was thirty-nine. In the words of the inquest: "Cardiac failure whilst under anaesthetic of ether and chloroform skilfully and properly administered for operation for removal of uterus." She and Richard were living at Greystone at the time, with Orwell working in Paris as a war correspondent for The Observer. He reached Greystone on Saturday, 31 March. She is buried in Saint Andrew's and Jesmond Cemetery, West Jesmond, Newcastle upon Tyne.

Influence on Orwell's writing
Some scholars believe that Eileen had a large influence on Orwell's writing. It is suggested  that Orwell's novel Nineteen Eighty-Four may have been influenced by one of Eileen's poems, End of the Century, 1984, The poem was written in 1934, to celebrate the fiftieth anniversary of the school she went to, Sunderland Church High School, and to look ahead 50 years to the school's centenary in 1984.

Although the poem was written a year before she met Blair, there are some similarities between the futuristic vision of Eileen's poem and that in Nineteen Eighty-Four, including the use of mind control, and the eradication of personal freedom by a police state.

References

Citations

Sources

Further reading
 Sylvia Topp: Eileen : the making of George Orwell, London : Unbound, 2020,

External links
Text of "End of the Century, 1984"

1905 births
1945 deaths
British people of the Spanish Civil War
English civil servants
George Orwell
Civil servants in the Ministry of Food
People educated at Sunderland High School
Alumni of University College London
People from South Shields
Women in the Spanish Civil War